Persann Kumar Chaudhary is an Indian politician from Uttar Pradesh. He is member of Uttar Pradesh Legislative Assembly since 10 March 2022 from Shamli representing Rashtriya Lok Dal.

References 

Living people
Year of birth missing (living people)
Rashtriya Lok Dal politicians
Uttar Pradesh MLAs 2022–2027